Ellsworth Historic District, also known as Ellsworth Addition, is a national historic district located at Lafayette, Tippecanoe County, Indiana.  The district encompasses 144 contributing buildings, 1 contributing site, and 4 contributing structures in a predominantly residential section of Lafayette.  It developed between about 1844 and 1936 and includes representative examples of Italianate, Second Empire, Queen Anne, and Bungalow / American Craftsman style architecture.  Located in the district are the separately listed Falley Home, Moses Fowler House, and Temple Israel.  Other notable buildings include the Second Presbyterian Church (1894-1895), Alexander House (c. 1880), Ball Brothers House (c. 1845), Falley Townhouse (c. 1892), Home Block (c. 1870), Annie Fowler House (c. 1870), and Duplex Townhouse (c. 1890).

It was listed on the National Register of Historic Places in 1986.

See also
Centennial Neighborhood District
Downtown Lafayette Historic District
Highland Park Neighborhood Historic District
Jefferson Historic District
Ninth Street Hill Historic District
Park Mary Historic District
Park Mary Historic District
Perrin Historic District
St. Mary Historic District
Upper Main Street Historic District

References

Historic districts on the National Register of Historic Places in Indiana
Italianate architecture in Indiana
Queen Anne architecture in Indiana
Second Empire architecture in Indiana
Neighborhoods in Lafayette, Indiana
Historic districts in Lafayette, Indiana
National Register of Historic Places in Tippecanoe County, Indiana